Frederick G. Bellars (January 2, 1888 – May 10, 1971) was an American track and field athlete who competed in the 1908 Summer Olympics. In 1908 he finished eighth in the five miles competition.

References

1888 births
1971 deaths
American male long-distance runners
Olympic track and field athletes of the United States
Athletes (track and field) at the 1908 Summer Olympics
20th-century American people